JD Miller (born 1953) is a contemporary painter known for 3-D application of oil paint.

Early life 

Miller was born in San Diego, California, in 1953, and moved to Texas as a child, where he spent his early years studying guitar, trumpet, and piano. By the time he finished his undergraduate career at the University of North Texas, Miller was a flourishing studio musician and had founded Inside Track Studios, a music syndication studio with clients in 28 states. He continued on to graduate school to study sculpture and ceramics at Texas Woman's University, before officially beginning his professional painting career in 1998.

Career

Contemporary practice 
Miller's technique is largely based on his life experiences, he uses oil painting to illustrate the scenes and thoughts, allowing others to experience the event in their own way. He has deemed this concept Reflectionism and attempts to express these feelings through oil painting. His style is labeled as "3D", due to thick impasto strokes, sculpting the oil paint to give a painting texture resulting in a total three-dimensional effect, that has been called "transcendental".  This style of oil painting combines both aspect of painting, as well sculpture, as the oil paint must be sculpted to give it a 3D appearance. Due to the sculpting effect of this art style, Miller uses large amounts of paint. He uses Winsor & Newton brand oil paint. Miller's 3-D technique of oil painting acts as a hallmark of Reflectionism.

Awards and achievements 
Among his achievements and honors, JD Miller received the 2007 Rising Star Award by Fashion Group International. JD was the Official Artist for the 40th Anniversary of Shakespeare Dallas. In 2013, JD Miller was the official fine art provider for the Hampton Classic Horse Show. In 2013, JD Miller's artwork was selected to be displayed in the lobby of the modernist Patriot Tower, as part of a $100 million renovation.

Charity work 
Miller has helped raise funds for several foundations including the Dallas Children's Theater, Vox Humana Charity Event and Silent Auction, American Heart Association-Cotes de Coeur, Ronald McDonald House, Big Brothers, Big Sisters and Aidmatrix Digital Ball, Yellowstone Park Foundation, schools, the Cattle Baron's Ball benefiting the American Cancer Society and the Dallas Symphony Orchestra.

Current 
Miller is represented by Samuel Lynne Galleries in Dallas and by Premium Modern Art in Germany. Miller is represented in the Jesuit Dallas Museum and Meadows Museum – SMU University Art Collection, both in Dallas, Texas. He is also represented in the Longview Museum of Fine Arts. He is represented in numerous galleries and corporate collections throughout the United States, and involves himself with educational and charitable organizations. He has received the Dallas Jesuit Museum's 2009 Artist of the Year Award, the Fashion Group International 2008 Rising Star Award, and the distinction of being the Official Artist for the 40th Anniversary of Shakespeare Dallas. Currently based in Dallas, Texas, Miller's extensive travels throughout the U.S. continue to influence his subject matter and style – from Impressionist landscapes to abstract expressions of the spirit.

References

External links 
 Artist website
 Artist bio

Living people
21st-century American painters
1953 births
Painters from Texas
American male painters